Ang Liga is an inter-collegiate football tournament based in the Philippines. It served as a pre-season tourney for competing football varsity teams from the National Collegiate Athletic Association (NCAA), UAAP and other similar collegiate leagues, before the regular football tournaments begin within the second semester of the academic year.

Ang Liga, was founded in 2003 by Philippine Football Federation (PFF) Technical Director and Philippines national football team assistant coach Jose Ariston Caslib and Marlon Maro, who served as the head coach of the Philippines national under-23 football team. Ariel Serrantes is the league commissioner.

The league changed the tournament format in 2015. 12 collegiate teams will be placed under the first division and divided into two groups for the elimination round, while the remaining 7 teams played in the second division. Top four teams from the two groups will moved on in the knock-out quarterfinals, while the top four teams of second division will advanced into the semifinals.

The 14th season of the Ang Liga commenced on July 9, 2016, with majority of the games played at the Football Field of the San Beda College, Manila.

References

Ang Liga
Recurring sporting events established in 2003
2003 establishments in the Philippines
College association football in the Philippines